Jan Wehrmann (born 30 December 1969) is a German former professional footballer who played as a midfielder. He made a total of 32 appearances in the 2. Fußball-Bundesliga for Tennis Borussia Berlin during his playing career.

References 
 

1969 births
Living people
German footballers
Association football midfielders
2. Bundesliga players
SG Bergmann-Borsig players
Tennis Borussia Berlin players
FC Rot-Weiß Erfurt players